Vladimíra Racková, née Malátová (born 15 May 1967, in Opava) is a Czech discus thrower. Her personal best throw is 65.50 metres, achieved in June 2001 in Kladno.

International competitions

External links

1967 births
Living people
Sportspeople from Opava
Czech female discus throwers
Czechoslovak female discus throwers
Olympic athletes of Czechoslovakia
Athletes (track and field) at the 1992 Summer Olympics
Olympic athletes of the Czech Republic
Athletes (track and field) at the 2000 Summer Olympics
Athletes (track and field) at the 2004 Summer Olympics
World Athletics Championships athletes for Czechoslovakia
World Athletics Championships athletes for the Czech Republic
20th-century Czech women
21st-century Czech women